Penn Township is the name of three townships in Indiana:

 Penn Township, Jay County, Indiana
 Penn Township, Parke County, Indiana
 Penn Township, St. Joseph County, Indiana

Indiana township disambiguation pages